Zach Dailey (born November 14, 1981) is an American former professional tennis player.

Dailey, a native of Memphis, played collegiate tennis for Vanderbilt University and was a member of the Commodores side which finished runner-up in the 2003 NCAA Division I Championships. He was co-champion, with teammate Chad Harris, of the 2004 SEC Indoor Championships.

Graduating from Vanderbilt University in 2004, Dailey spent two years competing on the professional tour and reached a best singles world ranking of 682. He made his only ATP Tour main draw appearance at his home tournament, the 2005 Regions Morgan Keegan Championships in Memphis, where he lost in the first round to Robby Ginepri.

ITF Futures titles

Doubles: (1)

References

External links
 
 

1981 births
Living people
American male tennis players
Vanderbilt Commodores men's tennis players
Tennis people from Tennessee
Sportspeople from Memphis, Tennessee